Frederick Seymour Cocks,  (25 October 1882 – 29 May 1953) was a British Labour MP.

Born in Darlington, Cocks was educated at Plymouth College and became a journalist. He joined the Independent Labour Party and wrote several tracts for the party and for the Union of Democratic Control. He stood unsuccessfully for Maidstone at the 1923 general election. He was elected to the safe seat of Broxtowe at the 1929 general election.

After World War II, it was revealed that he had been placed on the 'Special Search List G.B' of prominent subjects to be arrested by the Nazis had they succeeded in invading Britain.
He was the author of a biography of fellow Labour Party member E. D. Morel, E.D. Morel, The Man and his work.

Cocks remained as the MP for Broxtowe until his death in Hendon in 1953, aged 70.

References

External links 
 

1882 births
1953 deaths
People from Darlington
Independent Labour Party MPs
Labour Party (UK) MPs for English constituencies
UK MPs 1929–1931
UK MPs 1931–1935
UK MPs 1935–1945
UK MPs 1945–1950
UK MPs 1950–1951
UK MPs 1951–1955
People educated at Plymouth College